Aristeguietia discolor is a species of flowering plant in the family Asteraceae. It is found only in Peru.

References

discolor
Flora of Peru
Near threatened plants
Taxonomy articles created by Polbot